Han Byung-do (7 December 1967) is a South Korean politician representing Iksan City at the National Assembly and previously served as Senior Secretary to the President Moon Jae-in for Political Affairs.

In 2004 Han was elected as member of the National Assembly from Iksan City becoming the youngest member elected in this election at the age of 37. Han convinced President Roh Moo-hyun to accept the honorary doctorate degree in politics from Han's alma mater, Wonkwang University. This is the one of three degrees Roh has from tertiary education - all honorary as Roh never went to college - and the only one from Korean university. Han was previously the president of its student union.

In 2016 he lost his election to Cho Bae-sook. Upon beginning of the President Moon Jae-in's presidency, he was appointed as his secretary for political affairs. Later that year, Han was promoted to a senior secretary, a vice-ministerial position. Han resigned the post for the 2020 South Korean legislative election. In that election, he defeated Cho who served three times as his constituency's representative and previously defeated him four years ago.

Han holds a bachelor's degree in communications from Wonkwang University.

Electoral history

References 

Living people
1967 births
People from Iksan
Members of the National Assembly (South Korea)
Minjoo Party of Korea politicians
South Korean government officials